Adrian Stanilewicz (born 22 February 2000) is a professional footballer who plays as a midfielder for Fortuna Köln. Initially, he represented Germany internationally on youth level before switching to representing Poland.

Club career
Stanilewicz made his professional debut for Bayer Leverkusen in the UEFA Europa League, coming on as a substitute in the 88th minute for Lucas Alario in the 5–1 away win against Cypriot club AEK Larnaca.

On 7 August 2020, Stanilewicz agreed to sign with SV Darmstadt 98 on a free transfer. He joined the team following Bayer Leverkusen's UEFA Europa League campaign was completed.

On 9 September 2022, he joined Regionalliga West side Fortuna Köln, reuniting with his Bayer youth coach Markus von Ahlen.

Personal life
Stanilewicz was born in Germany and is of Polish descent. He was previously a youth international for Germany, before switching to represent the Poland U20s.

He started all four games played by Poland U20 at the 2019 FIFA U-20 World Cup.

References

Links
 
 

2000 births
Living people
People from Solingen
Sportspeople from Düsseldorf (region)
Polish footballers
German footballers
Association football midfielders
Poland youth international footballers
Germany youth international footballers
German people of Polish descent
2. Bundesliga players
Bayer 04 Leverkusen players
SV Darmstadt 98 players
SC Fortuna Köln players
Footballers from North Rhine-Westphalia